Rhipha leucoplaga is a moth in the family Erebidae. It was described by Paul Dognin in 1910. It is found in French Guiana and Venezuela.

References

Moths described in 1910
Phaegopterina
Arctiinae of South America